Lead(II) fluoride is the inorganic compound with the formula PbF2.  It is a white solid.  It exists as both an orthorhombic and cubic forms.

Uses

Lead(II) fluoride is used in low melting glasses, in glass coatings to reflect infrared rays, in phosphors for television-tube screens, and as a catalyst for the manufacture of picoline. The Muon g−2 experiment uses  scintillators in conjunction with silicon photomultipliers.

Preparation
Lead(II) fluoride can be prepared by treating lead(II) hydroxide or lead(II) carbonate with hydrofluoric acid:
 Pb(OH)2 + 2 HF → PbF2 + 2 H2O

Alternatively, it is precipitated by adding hydrofluoric acid to a lead(II) salt solution, or by adding potassium fluoride to a lead(II) nitrate solution.
 2 KF + Pb(NO3)2 → PbF2 + 2 KNO3

It appears as the very rare mineral fluorocronite.

References

Fluorides
Lead(II) compounds
Metal halides
Phosphors and scintillators
Reagents for organic chemistry
Glass compositions